William "Lady, Billy" Taylor (May 15, 1880 – April 24, 1942) was a Canadian professional ice hockey player who played 96 games in various professional and amateur leagues, including the International Professional Hockey League. He was born in Paris, Ontario.

Career
Amongst the teams Taylor played with were the Canadian Soo Algonquins and the Michigan Soo Indians of the IPHL. Taylor also represented the Brantford Indians, St. Catharines Pros and Berlin Dutchmen of the Ontario Professional Hockey League. Prior to his exploits in professional ice hockey Taylor played with Brantford and Paris clubs in the Ontario Hockey Association. He was also a lacrosse player.

In the 1906–07 IPHL season Taylor led the league with 46 goals and 64 points in 24 games. In the three-year history of the IPHL only Lorne Campbell of the Pittsburgh Professionals scored more goals than Taylor, with 108 and 99 goals respectively, but in 15 more games played.

In the 1908 OPHL season Taylor scored 28 goals in 12 games for the Brantford Indians which placed him second in the league only behind Newsy Lalonde of the Toronto Professionals who scored 32 goals in 9 games.

Military duty
After his ice hockey career had ended Taylor enlisted with the Black Watch Regiment in Montreal and served with the 42nd Battalion during World War I in England and France between 1915–1917. He returned wounded to Canada with both a bullet and shrapnel in his body, and also had a silver plate inserted in his skull.

Statistics
Fit-Ref = Fit-Reform Trophy, SPHL = Saskatchewan Professional Hockey League, EOPHL = Eastern Ontario Professional Hockey League, NOHL = New Ontario Hockey League

Statistics per Society for International Hockey Research at sihrhockey.org

References
The Origins and Development of the International Hockey League and its effect on the Sport of Professional Ice Hockey in North America Daniel Scott Mason, University of British Columbia, 1992, p. 144–145.

Notes

Canadian ice hockey centres
Canadian military personnel of World War I
Sault Ste. Marie Marlboros players
Michigan Soo Indians players
Pittsburgh Athletic Club (ice hockey) players
Cobalt Silver Kings players
1880 births
1942 deaths